Richard Charles Nolan (March 26, 1932 – November 11, 2007) was an American football player and coach in the National Football League (NFL), and served as the head coach of the San Francisco 49ers and New Orleans Saints.

Early years
In his youth, Nolan was the starting quarterback at White Plains High School. He accepted a scholarship from the University of Maryland, where he was converted to running back and safety. He received honorable-mention All-American honors as a senior. He was a key contributor to the school's 1953 championship team.

Professional career
In the NFL, he played for a total of nine seasons (1954–62) in the defensive halfback, safety, and defensive back positions. He was selected in the fourth round (41st overall) of the 1954 NFL Draft by the New York Giants. On May 10, 1958, he was traded to the Chicago Cardinals. He returned to the Giants in 1959.

On April 27, 1962, he was traded to the Dallas Cowboys in a three-team deal, with the Green Bay Packers acquiring kicking specialist Allen Green and the Giants obtaining a draft pick from the Packers. He reunited with former teammate Tom Landry, who used Nolan as a "player-coach". When Nolan was injured halfway through his first season, he became the Cowboys' defensive coordinator.

Coaching career
Nolan was on the Cowboys' staff for six years, the last year being the season in which the Cowboys played in the Ice Bowl.  Afterwards, he was head coach of the San Francisco 49ers for eight seasons from 1968 through 1975, noted for developing the defense and taking the team to three straight NFC West division titles (1970–72), twice missing the Super Bowl by only one game (1970–71).  Additionally, he was head coach for the New Orleans Saints from 1978–80 going 15–29.  He was the first Saints head coach to win six, seven, and eight games in a single season, going 7–9 in 1978 and 8–8 in 1979.  Nolan was fired by the Saints in 1980 after an 0–12 start.  His last game was on November 24 of that season, a 27–7 loss to the Los Angeles Rams on Monday Night Football.  The Saints finished the 1980 season 1–15, as interim coach Dick Stanfel won only one of his four games, a 21–20 victory over the New York Jets in week 15.

His alma mater, the University of Maryland, College Park, interviewed Nolan for the head coach vacancy created when Jerry Claiborne left for Kentucky, but ultimately, chose Bobby Ross, instead.

Nolan holds the dubious distinction of being the head coach of the Arena Football League's San Antonio Force in 1992, the only team in Arena history to be shut out, 50-0 by the Orlando Predators on June 13, 1992

Nolan was well known for wearing business suits while coaching, as did many other coaches during his era. The NFL has since disallowed this practice in most circumstances due to the league signing exclusive apparel deals with sportswear companies (specifically Reebok and Nike). The league made an exception after Nolan's death in 2007, allowing Nolan's son Mike and Jack Del Rio, coach of the Jacksonville Jaguars, to wear suits in the elder Nolan's honor.

Head coaching record

References

External links

 NFL.com player page

1932 births
2007 deaths
American football safeties
Chicago Cardinals players
Dallas Cowboys coaches
Dallas Cowboys players
Denver Broncos coaches
Houston Oilers coaches
Maryland Terrapins football players
New Orleans Saints coaches
New Orleans Saints head coaches
New York Giants players
San Francisco 49ers head coaches
Arena Football League coaches
National Football League defensive coordinators
Sportspeople from Pittsburgh
Sportspeople from Westchester County, New York
People from White Plains, New York
Players of American football from New York (state)
Deaths from Alzheimer's disease
Neurological disease deaths in Texas
Deaths from prostate cancer
Deaths from cancer in Texas
White Plains High School alumni
Players of American football from Pittsburgh